Lenno was a comune (municipality) in the Province of Como in the Italian region Lombardy, located about  north of Milan and about  northeast of Como. As of 31 December 2004, it had a population of 1,800 and an area of 9.6 km2.

Lenno bordered the following municipalities: Bellagio, Bene Lario, Grandola ed Uniti, Lezzeno, Mezzegra, Ossuccio, Porlezza, Tremezzo. The Comune di Lenno was united to Mezzegra, Ossuccio and Tremezzo to form a single municipality named Comune di Tremezzina: the new administration was formalized after election of the Mayor on 25 May 2014.

Demographic evolution

Twin towns — sister cities
Lenno was twinned with:

  Lemnos, Greece

References

External links

Cities and towns in Lombardy
Tremezzina